Kyun Hota Hai Pyarrr is an Indian television teen romantic drama which originally aired on Star Plus from 1 August 2002 to 22 July 2004. It starred Amit Sadh and Riva Bubber.

Synopsis
The show revolves around Adi and Nikki and their group of friends in college. While Adi is a rich popular boy in college, Nikki moves to Mumbai and is an introvert trying to find her feet in a new city.

Nikki meets several characters in college making friends, but falls out of favor with the rich and spoilt. Ash has had her sights set on Adi, but Adi and Nikki fall in love with each other.

Cast. 
 Amit Sadh / Sudeep Sahir as Aditya (Adi) Bhargav
 Riva Bubber as Nikita (Nikki) Sharma
 Shilpa Tulaskar as Aarti Sharma
 Sonal Pendse as Aishwarya (Ash) Kapoor
 Vikas Sethi as Karan / Kukku
 Shruti Seth as Ramya
 Nazneen Patel / Shalini Pal as Malini
 Harmeet Singh as Abhi
 Shweta Gulati as Tara
 Joe Warbis as Terry
 Vinay Pathak as Professor
 Pracheen Chauhan as Abhi
 Kamya Panjabi as Ramya

References

External links 
Kyun Hota Hai Pyarrr on STAR Plus

Indian television soap operas
Indian television series
StarPlus original programming
2002 Indian television series debuts
2004 Indian television series endings
Indian teen drama television series